is a railway station in the town of Tozawa, Yamagata Prefecture, Japan, operated by East Japan Railway Company (JR East).

Lines
Takaya Station is served by the Rikuu West Line, and is located 24.8 kilometers from the terminus of the line at Shinjō Station.

Station layout
Takaya Station has one side platform, serving a single bidirectional track. The station is unattended.

History
Takaya Station opened on February 15, 1952. With the privatization of Japanese National Railways (JNR) on April 1, 1987, the station came under the control of JR East.

Surrounding area
 Shiraito Falls 
 Mogami River
 Kusanagi Hot Springs

See also
 List of railway stations in Japan

References

External links

 JR East station information 

Railway stations in Yamagata Prefecture
Rikuu West Line
Railway stations in Japan opened in 1952
Stations of East Japan Railway Company
Tozawa, Yamagata